Studenci is a village in Perušić, Croatia. The 2011 census counted 44 residents.

Geography
Studenci is called the "village of the Imotski region". It is located at the Southeastern edge of the Dinaric Alps and is surrounded by peaks of Biokovo, Mosor, Kamešnica, Tušnica, and Zavelim. This village features sinkholes and karst hills. A church named Sv. Elijah is located in the center of town. 

Studenci has a moderate sub-Mediterranean to moderate continental climate. The area's deciduous vegetation includes tough hornbeam, oak, ash, pine, poplar, willow, cherry, almond, immortelle, sage and pelim. Animals in the area include foxes, crickets, frogs, rabbits, grouse and magpies.

History
Studenci features architecture in the style of Ancient Rome. Many buildings, including churches and villas, were constructed while the area was under Roman governance. Studenci is the site of many Ancient Roman ruins.

References

Populated places in Lika-Senj County